Craig David Ross is an American guitarist best known for performing and recording with Lenny Kravitz.

Early life
Craig Ross was born and raised in Los Angeles, California. He has two daughters named Mia and Devon with his first wife Anna. Since 2014, he has been married to Spanish actress Goya Toledo.

Craig Ross borrowed a guitar from a neighbor's garage at age eight. He began playing the music of the Beatles and Chuck Berry, his early influences.

Career
Before the age of sixteen, Ross started playing the L.A. clubs and eventually formed the band The Broken Homes while in high school, and going by the stage name Kreg Ross. They opened for prominent musicians like Stevie Ray Vaughan, INXS, and Jerry Lee Lewis, among others, while doing clubs gigs with bands such as Guns N' Roses and Jane's Addiction. The band made three records for MCA records in the 80s, working with producers such as Andy Johns of Led Zeppelin and Rolling Stones fame. This seminal period gave Craig his education in studio work.

His musical influences include Freddie King, Albert King, Jimi Hendrix, Jimmy Page.

A 'chance meeting' in an L.A. pool hall with Lenny Kravitz (facilitated by Kathy Valentine of The Go-Go's) led to a twenty plus year association. After touring with Kravitz for 1991's "Mama Said", Craig joined Lenny in the studio, co-writing and playing all the guitars on the track "Are You Gonna Go My Way", an anthem that helped elevate Lenny's career to new heights. The collaboration continued with stand-out solos on tracks such as "Believe" and "Is There Any love in Your Heart" helping make Lenny a top rock act.  Craig has written and played on every subsequent Lenny album since as well as records by Sheryl Crow, Mick Jagger, B.B. King, Eric Clapton, The Black Crowes, Nikka Costa and others.
 
Ross co-wrote the songs "Spinning Around Over You", "Are You Gonna Go My Way", "Is There Any Love in Your Heart", "Where Are We Runnin'?", "Stillness of Heart", and "Lady"  with Kravitz, as well as a number of songs on Kravitz's 2008 release It Is Time for a Love Revolution.  He also toured with Kravitz, including at the Glastonbury Festival in 1999.

Ross played on The Black Crowes 2001 album, Lions, on the track "Greasy Grass River", and on former Black Crowes guitarist Marc Ford's first solo album, It's About Time in 2003.

Ross, with Lenny Kravitz, performed at the 2012 Kennedy Center Honors tribute to Led Zeppelin by playing "Whole Lotta Love".

References

Year of birth missing (living people)
Living people
American rock guitarists
American male guitarists
Guitarists from Los Angeles